Cantabria contains the following comarcas:

 Asón-Agüera
 Bay of Santander
 Besaya
 Campoo-Los Valles
 Western Coast
 Eastern Coast
 Liébana
 Valles Pasiegos
 Saja-Nansa
 Trasmiera

See also
Comarcas of Spain